The LEM-3, (a.k.a. LIG-6 (Leningradskii Institoot Grazdahnskovo Vozdooshnovo Flota-  Leningrad Institute civil air fleet)), was a transport aircraft designed and built in the USSR from  1936.

Development 
In 1930 the LIIPS ( - Leningrad institute for sail and communications engineers) formed a UK GVF ( - training centre for civil air fleet), in turn the UK GVF formed the NIAI (Naoochno-Issledovatel'skiy Aero-Institoot - scientific test aero-institute) which became the focus of several good design engineers who were given command of individual OKB (Osboye Konstrooktorskoye Byuro – personal design/construction bureau).

The LEM-3 was designed by  Yuri Vladimirovich Domrachayev & Leonid Sergeyevich Vild'grub as a very high efficiency transport akin to a motor-glider, with high aspect ratio wings and a low-powered engine. The all wood LEM-3 had a conventional tricycle undercarriage, long span wings were supported by a truss running from approx 1/3 span to the bottom of the u/c legs to the other wing. The initial version had a side-by-side open cockpit, for the two pilots, and an eight-seat cabin with four bench sets under hinged roof access panels with small windows as well as four cargo compartments in the enlarged  wing roots.  The engine drove a U-2 Propeller, with which the flight tests began in 1936. The factory testing was completed by early 1937 when the aircraft was flown to Moscow for testing at the NII GVF(Naoochno-Issledovatel'skiy Institoot Grazdahnskovo Vozdooshnovo Flota - scientific 	test institute for civil air fleet), unfortunately the aircraft suffered a forced landing on arrival at the NII GVF airfield and further work was abandoned. A modified version with a large enclosed cabin, trousered main undercarriage, anti nose-over skid and Townend ring cowling, was mooted in a contemporary drawing, but there is no evidence that this version was built, modified, or flown.

Specifications (LEM-3)

See also
 List of aircraft

References

 Gunston, Bill. “The Osprey Encyclopaedia of Russian Aircraft 1875 – 1995”. London, Osprey. 1995. 

1930s Soviet airliners
NIAI aircraft
Motor gliders
Aircraft first flown in 1934